Rhyacodromia is a genus of flies in the family Empididae.

Species
R. flavicoxa Saigusa, 1986

References

Empidoidea genera
Empididae